The Spaghetti Bowl is the colloquial name for a freeway interchange in downtown Las Vegas, Nevada. It is the system interchange between Interstate 15, Interstate 515, U.S. Route 93 and U.S. Route 95, which also includes a service interchange with Martin Luther King Boulevard.

The interchange, which was substantially rebuilt between 1999 and 2000, carries more than 300,000 cars and trucks per day.

History
The original Spaghetti Bowl was constructed in the mid 1960s by Kiewit Corporation and was completed by 1968. Upon completion, the interchange connected I-15 to the new, cross-town Las Vegas Expressway. That highway, which carried US 95 (relocated from Bonanza Road) and was later renamed in honor of Oran K. Gragson, served as a mile-long spur to Las Vegas Boulevard in downtown Las Vegas on the east and eventually served as a new bypass of Rancho Drive for US 95 traffic to the west and north.

Between 1982 and 1994, the US 95 freeway was extended to the east (concurrent with US 93) past downtown and then southeast toward Henderson, Nevada, eventually being co-designated as I-515. Also in the 1980s, new interchanges, including one with a new feeder freeway, the Summerlin Parkway, were constructed along the US 95 Gragson Freeway to the west and northwest of the Spaghetti Bowl. The increased traffic on the cross-town freeway left the I-15 interchange, with its two loop ramps, several closely spaced ramps and no ramp wider than one lane, totally inadequate; it had been designed to carry only about 60,000 vehicles a day.

In the late 1990s, NDOT began a reconstruction project at the interchange, with new, wider ramps and elimination of the loops. By November 1999, ramps had been built and opened to provide access in all directions to and from nearby Martin Luther King Boulevard (except for an onramp to US 95 north), which had only partial access in the prior configuration. The overall project was completed in August 2000 with the opening of the new flyovers and other reconfigured freeway-to-freeway ramps.

On May 22, 2015, there was a magnitude 4.8 earthquake several miles north of Las Vegas near the town of Caliente. This earthquake caused what appeared to be damage to the southbound US 95 ramp to southbound Interstate 15 and the Nevada Highway Patrol shut down the ramp around 12:20 p.m. local time. Upon further inspection by the Nevada Department of Transportation (NDOT), the quake dislodged protective rubber encasing a previously-damaged bridge joint. With no structural damage caused by the earthquake, the ramp was reopened around 5:00 p.m. the same day.

Project Neon
HOV connectors were added from I-15 north to US 95 north and from US 95 south to I-15 south. On I-15 south of the interchange, collector-distributor roads were constructed to eliminate traffic bottleneck and weaving on I-15 south between the Sahara Avenue and Charleston Boulevard interchanges and the US 95 ramps.

References

Buildings and structures in Las Vegas
Interstate 15
Metaphors referring to spaghetti
Road interchanges in the United States
Transportation in the Las Vegas Valley